The Midgley family is a British theatrical family whose members are notable in light music, opera and operetta.

 Walter Midgley (1914-1980) was an internationally renowned operatic tenor.
 Gladys Midgley (1911-2005) was a soprano.
 Maryetta Midgley is their daughter and a soprano. 
 Vernon Midgley is a tenor.

Midgley Family
British families